Sibongile Ndlela-Simelane was Minister for Health for Eswatini from 2013 to 2018 under the government of Barnabas Sibusiso Dlamini. During her time as minister she led calls for lessons from southern Africa's HIV response to be applied to malaria. She also commissioned on World TB Day in 2017 a national drug resistance survey. In 2018 she requested the arrest of a Eswatini Observer journalist who had photographed the cars of government ministers. She also commissioned new offices for the Swaziland Nursing Council.

In 2022 she was appointed Chairperson of the Eswatini Communications Commission (ESSCOM).

Ndlela-Simelane grew up in a single-parent family and announced in 2015 at Bulandzeni Church of the Nazarene that she had never met her father.

References

External links 

 Sihlwitsa Likusasa Episode 3 With Sibongile Ndlela-Simelane

Year of birth missing (living people)
Living people
Swazi politicians
Swazi women in politics